Air bomb may refer to:

Airbomb, a type of firework
Aerial bomb, an explosive weapon dropped through the air

See also
Airstrike, an offensive operation carried out by aircraft
Bat bomb, an experimental World War II weapon
Hail Mary pass, a very long forward pass in American football
Microburst, an intense small-scale downdraft produced by a thunderstorm or rain shower
Thermobaric weapon, a type of explosive that uses oxygen from the surrounding air to generate a high-temperature explosion